Meseta de Cacaxtla Flora and Fauna Protection Area is a protected area in the state of Sinaloa in western Mexico. It covers an area of 508.62 km2.

Geography
It is bounded on the west by the Pacific Ocean, and on the east by Mexican Federal Highway 15. Mexican Federal Highway 15D runs through the protected area, parallel to the shore.

Ecology
The protected area is in the Sinaloan dry forests ecoregion, and includes areas of deciduous thorn scrub, mangrove, coastal lagoon, and beach.

Flora and Fauna
According to the National Biodiversity Information System of Comisión Nacional para el Conocimiento y Uso de la Biodiversidad (CONABIO) in Meseta de Cacaxtla Flora and Fauna Protection Area there are over 1,215 plant and animal species from which 81 are in at risk category and 62 are exotics.

Conservation
The reserve was designated in 2000.

References

Flora and fauna protection areas of Mexico
Sinaloan dry forests
Protected areas of Sinaloa